Yahya ibn Abi Mansur, also called  Bizist, son of Firuzan (d. 830) was a senior Persian official from the Banu al-Munajjim family, who served as an astronomer and an astrologer at the court of Abbasid caliph al-Ma'mun. Since his father Abu Mansur Aban was an astrologer in service of caliph al-Mansur, it can be concluded that Yahya spent his childhood in Baghdad.

Yahya ibn Abi Mansur's first known position was as an astrologer for al-Fadl ibn Sahl, vizier of the caliph al-Ma'mun. After the assassination of al-Fadl, Yahya converted to Islam and adopted his Arabic name. He is associated with the House of Wisdom, and is mentioned as a teacher of the Banu Musa. He died near Aleppo in 830.

References

Sources 
  (PDF version)

Further reading 
 
 
 

9th-century Iranian astronomers
Astronomers of the medieval Islamic world
Converts to Islam from Zoroastrianism
People from Amol
830 deaths
9th-century astrologers
9th-century people from the Abbasid Caliphate